Ivan Stevović (6 September 1910 – 4 February 1999) was a Yugoslav footballer. He played in five matches for the Yugoslavia national football team from 1933 to 1939. He was also named in Yugoslavia's squad for the Group 3 qualification tournament for the 1938 FIFA World Cup.

References

1910 births
1999 deaths
Yugoslav footballers
Yugoslavia international footballers
Association football defenders
Footballers from Belgrade
OFK Beograd players